Gaius Calvisius Sabinus (born c. 36 BC) was a Roman Senator who was appointed consul in 4 BC.

Biography
Calvisius Sabinus was the son of Gaius Calvisius Sabinus, who was consul in 39 BC. Following in his father's footsteps, he is presumed to have been elected as one of the Septemviri epulonum, probably sometime after 12 BC, and possibly after the death of Marcus Vipsanius Agrippa or Appius Claudius Pulcher.

Calvisius Sabinus was elected to the consulship as an imperial candidate in 4 BC. During his consulship he introduced and spoke in favour of an imperial edict which strengthened the rights of people designated as allies of Rome in recovering money that may have been extorted from them.

Calvisius Sabinus had at least one son, Gaius Calvisius Sabinus, who was elected consul in AD 26.

See also
 Calvisia gens#Calvisii Sabini, for others with a similar name

Sources
 Syme, Ronald, The Augustan Aristocracy (1986). Clarendon Press.

References

1st-century BC Romans
30s BC births
Senators of the Roman Empire
Imperial Roman consuls
Epulones of the Roman Empire
Sabinus, Gaius
Year of death unknown